Syed Ammal Engineering College at Ramanathapuram, India, is a self-financing institution founded by Dr. E. M. Abdullah. The college is situated on the Dr. E. M. Abdullah Campus

Programmes

Under Graduate Programme 
Computer Science and Engineering
B.Tech. Artificial Intelligence and Data Science
B.Tech Computer Science and Business Systems

Electronics and Communication 
Electrical and Electronics 

Mechanical Engineering
Civil Engineering

Post Graduate Programme 

 Computer Science and Engineering
 VLSI Design
 Embedded systems
 Manufacturing and Engineering
 Power Electronics
 Master in Business Administration (MBA)

External links

Engineering colleges in Tamil Nadu
Ramanathapuram district